Wilson Hills is a hill station in the Indian state of Gujarat.  It is near Dharampur Taluka and is also the nearest hill station to valsad Surat.

Wilson Hills stands in a densely forested region close to the Pangarbari Wildlife Sanctuary. It is one of the few hill stations in the world from which it is possible to glimpse the sea.

It has an average elevation of 750m (2500 feet). The Wilson Hills are popular during the summer months as it enjoys a cooler and less humid climate than the surrounding area.

View points

There are a total of six points on the Wilson Hills and other places near Wilson Hills.

 Marble Chatri Point
 Steep Valley Point
 Ozone Valley Point
 Sunrise Point
 Sunset Point
 Shankar waterfalls point
 Barumal temple 
 Lady Wilson museum
 The district science centre
 Jalaram dham faladhara
 Bilpudi twin waterfalls
 Ganesh waterfalls Makadban
 Khoba waterfalls
 U turn point, Khadki

History 
Wilson Hills was named in memory of Lord Wilson, the Governor of Mumbai from 1923 to 1928, by Vijay Devji, the last King of Dharampur. Lord Wilson and King Vijay Devji had planned to develop the area into a hill station, but the project failed to take place. A monument to their memory remains on the peak.

Location 
It is connected by a tar road to the town of Dharampur, which is 29 km (18 miles) away at the base of the hills.

Distance from towns and cities
 Dharampur, India - 25 km
 Chikhli, Gujarat - 55 km
 Saputara - 120 km 
 Vapi - 62 km
 Valsad - 55 km
 Navsari - 81 km
 Surat - 126 km
 Mumbai - 250 km
 Barumal - 18 km
 Nashik - 145 km
 Nanapondha - 41 km
 Ahmedabad - 485 km

References

Tourist attractions in Gujarat
Tourist attractions in Valsad district
Hill stations in Gujarat
Hills of Gujarat